Pré-Petitjean railway station is a railway station in the municipality of Montfaucon, in the Swiss canton of Jura. It is located on the  La Chaux-de-Fonds–Glovelier line of the Chemins de fer du Jura. The depot of the La Traction railway preservation group is located just east of the station.

Services 
 the following services stop at Pré-Petitjean:

References

External links 
 
 

Railway stations in the canton of Jura
Chemins de fer du Jura stations